Nipapat Sudsiri, nicknamed Lek (born April 9, 1950) was Miss Thailand 1971. she competed in the Miss Universe 1972 pageant competition held in Puerto Rico.

She married businessman Jatuporn Sihanatkathakul, and currently she works in the hotel business.

References 

1950 births
Living people
Nipapat Sudsiri
Miss Universe 1972 contestants